Nottingham was a parliamentary borough in Nottinghamshire, which elected two Members of Parliament (MPs) to the House of Commons from 1295. In 1885 the constituency was abolished and the city of Nottingham divided into three single-member constituencies.

History
Nottingham sent two representatives to Parliament from 1283 onwards.

In the mid eighteenth century it was influenced by the large local landowners the Duke of Newcastle for the Whigs and Lord Middleton for the Tories and as a consequence would tend to return MP from each party.

The constituency was abolished in 1885 and replaced by Nottingham East, Nottingham South and Nottingham West.

Members of Parliament

1295–1640

1640–1885

Notes

Election results

Elections in the 1830s

 
 
 
 

 
 

 
 
 
 

Ponsonby was appointed Home Secretary and elevated to the House of Lords as Lord Duncannon, causing a by-election.

 
 
 

 
 

Hobhouse was appointed as President of the Board of Control for the Affairs of India, requiring a by-election.

Elections in the 1840s
Ferguson's death caused a by-election.

 
 

 
 
 

 

 

Walter and Charlton retired half an hour after the poll opened.

Larpent resigned by accepting the office of Steward of the Chiltern Hundreds, causing a by-election.

 

 

Walter's election was declared void, on petition, due to bribery by his agents, on 23 March 1843, causing a by-election.

 
 
 

Hobhouse was appointed President of the Board of Control for the Affairs of India, requiring a by-election.

Elections in the 1850s

 

 

 

 

Strutt was appointed Chancellor of the Duchy of Lancaster, requiring a by-election.

Strutt was elevated to the peerage, becoming 1st Baron Belper, requiring a by-election.

Elections in the 1860s
Mellor resigned after being appointed a Judge of the Queen's Bench Division of the High Court of Justice, causing a by-election.

 

 

 

 

 

The election, "won by violence" and bribery was declared void on petition, causing a by-election.

 

 

 
 

 

 
 

 

 

 

 Wright was a Liberal-Conservative candidate.

Clifton's death caused a by-election.

Elections in the 1870s
Wright's resignation caused a by-election.

Elections in the 1880s

Wright's death caused a by-election.

References 
 Robert Beatson, "A Chronological Register of Both Houses of Parliament" (London: Longman, Hurst, Res & Orme, 1807) 
 F W S Craig, "British Parliamentary Election Results 1832–1885" (2nd edition, Aldershot: Parliamentary Research Services, 1989)
 J Holladay Philbin, Parliamentary Representation 1832 – England and Wales (New Haven: Yale University Press, 1965)

Parliamentary constituencies in Nottinghamshire (historic)
Constituencies of the Parliament of the United Kingdom established in 1295
Constituencies of the Parliament of the United Kingdom disestablished in 1885